Aurel Constantin Popovici (16 October 1863  – 9 February 1917) was an ethnic Romanian Austro-Hungarian lawyer and politician.

Biography
He was born in Lugos, Kingdom of Hungary, Austrian Empire (today Lugoj, Romania). The son of an artisan, Constantin Popovici, and his wife Maria, he completed primary and secondary education and studied at the Hungarian Gymnasium in Lugoj (Lugos) (1873–1880), and then at the Romanian Lyceum in Beiuș (Belényes) (1880–1884). In 1885, he enrolled at the University of Vienna to study medicine and philosophy and later transferred to the University of Graz. In 1891, he became one of the leaders of the National Romanian Party and one of the editors of Tribuna. Together with other Romanian intellectuals of the National Romanian Party, in 1892 he signed the Transylvanian Memorandum, a document pleading for Romanians' equal rights with Hungarians in Transylvania, and demanding an end to persecutions and Magyarization attempts. In 1893, he moved to Austria, then to Italy and later Romania. In 1899, he founded the journal România Junǎ ("The Young Romania") in Bucharest.

In 1906, in his book, he proposed the federalization of the Austro-Hungarian monarchy into the so-called United States of Greater Austria. Between 1908 and 1909, he was the editor-in-chief and director of Romanian journal Sămănătorul ("The Sower") in Bucharest. In 1912, he settled in Vienna. After Romania's entrance into World War I in 1916, he moved to Geneva, Switzerland, and died there in 1917. 

Popovici was buried in the cemetery next to St. Nicholas Church in Brașov (Brassó).

It was not until the 1980s that his work was subjected to scholarly analysis and historiographic assessments.

Publications

See also 
 United States of Greater Austria
 Oszkár Jászi

References

External links
 Popovici, Aurel - Austria-Forum: AEIOU

1863 births
1917 deaths
People from Lugoj
People from the Kingdom of Hungary
Ethnic Romanian politicians in the Banat
University of Graz alumni
Romanian National Party politicians
Austro-Hungarian lawyers
Romanian journalists
Deaths in Switzerland